Pizzo Strinato is a mountain of Lombardy, Italy.

Like many mountains in the region, it consists mostly of alternating sedimentary layers of S3 acidic volcanics extending the Collio Formation, which are deformed into sigmoid shapes by repeated minor thrust deformations on the north face and by the more significant D4 deformation event on the southeast face.

Its highest ledges are home to the rare Eight-petal avens.

References 

Mountains of the Alps
Mountains of Lombardy